Dear Me is an autobiography by Peter Ustinov, published in 1977. The book's title is a play on words, since, in addition to "dear me" being a lament, it refers to the fact that the book is addressed to himself, as a conversation between Ustinov's "all too solid flesh" and "remorseless spirit."

Notes

1977 non-fiction books
Show business memoirs
Peter Ustinov
Books about actors